Sajawal Daku is a 1984 Pakistani Punjabi language action film, directed and produced by Agha Hussaini and Suhail Hussaini. Film starring actor Sultan Rahi in the lead role and with Rani and Humayun Qureshi as the villain.

Cast
 Sultan Rahi
 Mustafa Qureshi
 Rani
 Shagufta
 Humayun Qureshi
 Habib
 Nannha

Track list

References

External links
 * 

1980s crime action films
Pakistani crime action films
1984 films
Punjabi-language Pakistani films